The vice president of the Legislative Yuan (Chinese: 立法院副院長) is the deputy presiding officer of the Legislative Yuan of the Republic of China. The current Vice President is Tsai Chi-chang, a Democratic Progressive Party legislator representing the first district of Taichung.

Election
The Vice President is elected by and from among all members of the Yuan in a preparatory meeting held on the first reporting day of the first session of each Legislative Yuan, and serves a term the same length as that of other members.

Duty
In the absence of the President, the Vice President may preside over the Yuan Sittings and the meetings of the Committee of the Entire Yuan and is responsible for the administration of the Yuan.

List of vice presidents

Pre-1947 Constitution

1947 Constitution
The first Legislative Yuan election under the 1947 Constitution of the Republic of China was held in 1948. However, the government retreated to Taiwan in 1949. Members of the first Legislative Yuan had their terms extended indefinitely and the sessions of the first Legislative Yuan were conducted in Taiwan until December 31, 1991 while some supplementary members kept serving until January 31, 1993.

1991 Constitution amendment
The Additional Articles of the Constitution promulgated in 1991 mandated the total re-election of Legislative Yuan in Taiwan.

See also
 Legislative Yuan
 President of the Legislative Yuan
 Government of the Republic of China

References

Politics of the Republic of China
Lists of political office-holders in the Republic of China